Edward Katumba Wamala (born 19 November 1956), more commonly known as Katumba Wamala, is a Ugandan general who serves as Minister of Works and Transport in the Ugandan cabinet, since 14 December 2019.

Before that, from 17 January 2017 until 14 December 2019, he served as Minister of State for Works in the Ugandan cabinet. He previously served as the chief of defense forces of Uganda, the highest military rank in the Uganda People's Defense Force (UPDF), from 2013 until 2017.  He was the commander of land forces in the UPDF from 2005 to 2013. He also served as the inspector general of police (IGP) of the Uganda Police Force (UPF), the highest rank in that branch of Uganda's government, from 2001 until 2005. Wamala was the first active UPDF soldier to serve as the head of the UPF. On June 1, 2021, Katumba survived an assassination attempt in Kisaasi, a Kampala suburb when gunmen attacked and wounded the General, killing his daughter and driver, leaving him with gunshot wounds on both shoulders.

Background
He was born on 19 November 1956 in Bweeza, Kalangala District, Ssese Islands, in the Buganda Region of Uganda..

Education
Katumba holds a certificate in agriculture. In 2007, he graduated from Nkumba University with a Bachelor of Arts degree in international relations and diplomacy. He also holds a Master's degree of Science in strategic leadership from the United States Army War College. He has military qualifications from the following military schools: Uganda Military Academy, Tanzania Military Academy, a military academy in the Soviet Union, Nigerian Command and Staff College, United States Army Command and General Staff College, and United States Army War College.

Career
Wamala was an officer in the Uganda National Liberation Army (UNLA) when the National Resistance Army (NRA) defeated the UNLA in 1986. He transitioned into the NRA without incident.

Between 1999 and 2000, he was a student at the U.S. Army War College in Carlisle, Pennsylvania. Between 2000 and 2001, at the rank of major general, he commanded the UPDF forces in the Democratic Republic of the Congo. He was appointed IGP in 2001, serving in that capacity until 2005. He was then promoted to lieutenant general and given the title of commander of land forces, based at Bombo Military Barracks, making him one of the highest senior officers in the Ugandan military. In his role as commander of the land forces, he was closely engaged in the peace-keeping mission that the UPDF performs in Somalia, commonly referred to as AMISOM. On 23 May 2013, he was promoted to the rank of four-star general and appointed chief of defence forces.

Assassination attempt
On 1 June 2021, General Katumba Wamala was travelling to the city centre when four gunmen appeared and opened fire on his vehicle near his home, in Kisaasi, a Kampala suburb.   Wamala suffered gunshot wounds to both shoulders, but survived and was rushed to hospital. His driver, Haruna Kayondo,  and daughter, Brenda Wamala Nantongo, were killed at the scene of the attack. After a month of investigation, on July 1, 2021, authorities revealed that the attackers were Islamic extremists who were trained in a jihadist camp in North Kivu, Democratic Republic of Congo, and had links with the Allied Democratic Forces and the Islamic State.

The President, Yoweri Museveni, condemned the attack, describing it as the work of "pigs who do not value life".

See also
 Elly Kayanja
 Kasirye Ggwanga

References

External links

 General Katumba Wamala's Page At Parliament.go.ug
 Images of General Katumba Wamala At Google.com

 

1956 births
Living people
People from Kalangala District
Ganda people
Ugandan police chiefs
Ugandan military personnel
Law enforcement in Uganda
Uganda Military Academy alumni
United States Army Command and General Staff College alumni
Non-U.S. alumni of the Command and General Staff College
United States Army War College alumni
Nkumba University alumni
Tanzania Military Academy alumni
Government ministers of Uganda
Members of the Parliament of Uganda
Ugandan generals
Ugandan victims of crime
21st-century Ugandan politicians
Public works ministers of Uganda
Transport ministers of Uganda